Cirripectes randalli is a species of combtooth blenny found in the western Indian ocean.  This species reaches a length of  SL. The specific name honours the American ichthyologist John E. Randall of the Bishop Museum in Honolulu.

References

randalli
Taxa named by Jeffrey T. Williams
Fish described in 1988